Bekechevo (Bikes) is a rural locality (a village) in Tlyaumbetovsky Selsoviet, Kugarchinsky District, Bashkortostan, Russia. The population was 299 as of 2010. There are 3 streets.

Geography 
Bekechevo is located 37 km west of Mrakovo (the district's administrative centre) by road. Tlyaumbetovo is the nearest rural locality.

References 

Rural localities in Kugarchinsky District